Nagalingam is an Indian Tamil-language devotional film written and directed by Babu Ganesh, who also starred in the titular role. Apart from acting and directing, Babu Ganesh also wrote the script, composed the music and handled editing and choreography respectively. The film, which also starred Ravali, Neena and Babloo Prithiveeraj in leading roles, released on 23 June 2000.

Cast
Babu Ganesh as Nagalingam
Ravali as Priya
Neena as Nagakanni
Babloo Prithiveeraj as Raja

Production
The team released a press note prior to release announcing that they would be the first Tamil film to feature fragrances throughout the movie. The decision was taken in a bid to curb piracy and the team revealed that they had prepared smells of rose petals, camphor, sambrani and jasmine to be released with scenes. Babu Ganesh also hoped to make the feat reach the Guinness Book of Records, and explained the trick used would be a simple adaptation of the aerosol principle. During the making of the film, actress Ravali fell out with Babu Ganesh regarding her payment. She subsequently approached the Nadigar Sangam and the organisation's president Vijayakanth helped settle her dues.

Release
The film opened to poor reviews, with a critic claiming "if we watch the movie disregarding such deficiencies in story and screenplay, it does works as a comedy, though that was probably not the effect the director intended." The fragrance gimmick used by the producers received negative feedback from audiences.

References

2000 films
Hindu devotional films
2000s Tamil-language films